Stigmella is a genus name that may refer to:

 Stigmella (moth), a genus of moths in the family Nepticulidae
 Stigmella (fungus), a plant pathogenic ascomycete fungi genus of uncertain affiliation (e.g. Stigmella platani-racemosae)